Adam Muto (born July 19, 1980) is an American writer, director, storyboard artist, animator, and producer known for his work as the executive producer and showrunner of the animated television series Adventure Time.

Career
Muto was a classmate of Adventure Time creator Pendleton Ward at CalArts. When Ward was first working on the Adventure Time pilot for the Frederator incubator series Random! Cartoons, Muto assisted him by drawing props. Eventually, Muto went on to work on the television series, serving as a storyboard artist. During the show's first season, he was partnered with Elizabeth Ito, but during the show's second and third seasons, he was partnered with Rebecca Sugar. During the following year, he was promoted to creative director, and midway through the show's fifth season, he was promoted to supervising producer, then co-executive producer. From mid-season five until the show's conclusion, he served as the show's showrunner and executive producer (following Ward's stepping down sometime during the production of season five).

Awards
Adam Muto's work on Adventure Time gained him a Primetime Emmy Award nomination for the second season episode "It Came from the Nightosphere" in 2011, along with his then-storyboarding partner Rebecca Sugar.

Filmography

References

External links 

 

Living people
American animated film directors
American animated film producers
American television writers
American male television writers
Creative directors
American animators
Place of birth missing (living people)
American storyboard artists
Showrunners
Cartoon Network Studios people
Primetime Emmy Award winners
1980 births
21st-century American screenwriters
21st-century American male writers
Writers from Seattle
Screenwriters from Washington (state)
Film directors from Washington (state)